157 (one hundred [and] fifty-seven) is the number following 156 and preceding 158.

In mathematics
157 is:

 the 37th prime number. The next prime is 163 and the previous prime is 151.
 a balanced prime, because the arithmetic mean of those primes yields 157.
 an emirp.
 a Chen prime.
(see ).
 the least irregular prime with index 2.
 a palindromic number in bases 7 (3137) and 12 (11112).
 a repunit in base 12, so it is a unique prime in the same base.
 a prime whose digits sum to a prime. (see ).
 a prime index prime.

In base 10, 1572 is 24649, and 1582 is 24964, which uses the same digits. The previous entry is 13, and the next entry after 157 is 913.

The simplest right angle triangle with rational sides that has area 157 has the longest side with a denominator of 45 digits.

In the military
  was a United States Coast Guard cutter built in 1926
  was a United States Navy Type T2 tanker during World War II
  was a United States Navy Alamosa-class cargo ship during World War II
  was a United States Navy Admirable-class minesweeper during World War II
  was a United States Navy Wickes-class destroyer during World War II
  was a United States Navy Buckley-class destroyer escort during World War II
  was a United States Navy General G. O. Squier-class transport ship during World War II
  was a United States Navy LST-542-class tank landing ship during World War II
  was a United States Navy ship during World War II
  was a United States Navy transport military ship during World War II
  was a United States Navy yacht during World War I
 ZIL-157 is a 2.5-ton truck produced in post-World War II Russia

In music
 "157 Riverside Avenue" is a song by REO Speedwagon from their debut album, REO Speedwagon in 1971. Its title refers to a Westport, Connecticut address where the band stayed while recording it.
 Piano Sonata No. 1 in E major, D. 157 is a piano sonata in three movements by Franz Schubert.
 "157" is a song by Tom Rosenthal where the lyrics merely consist of the numbers from 1 to 157. The song was released on April Fools' Day, 2020.

In sports
 Ken Carpenter held the US record in discus, and won the NCAA national title with a toss of 157 feet in 1936.
 Steph Curry of the Golden State Warriors holds the NBA record for 157 consecutive games with a 3-point field goal made (from November 13, 2014 to November 4, 2016).

In transportation
 The British Rail Class 157 was the designation for a range of Diesel multiple unit trains of the Sprinter family
 London Buses route 157
 American Airlines Flight 157 from New York City bound for Mexico City crashed on November 29, 1949
 157th Street (IRT Broadway – Seventh Avenue Line), a New York City Subway station at Broadway in Manhattan served by the 
 157th Street (Manhattan), a street in New York City

In other fields
157 is also:
 The year AD 157 or 157 BC
 157 AH is a year in the Islamic calendar that corresponds to 773–774 CE
 The atomic number of an element temporarily called Unpentseptium.
 157 Dejanira is a main belt asteroid
 O157, Escherichia coli O157:H7
 Financial Accounting Standards Board Statement No. 157 defines fair value
 South Qu'appelle No. 157, Saskatchewan is a rural municipality in Saskatchewan, Canada
 United States Department of State Form DS-157 is Supplemental Nonimmigrant Visa Application
 One57, a partially completed skyscraper at 157 West 57th Street in New York City, on which the crane partially collapsed during Hurricane Sandy

See also
 List of highways numbered 157
 United Nations Security Council Resolution 157
 United States Supreme Court cases, Volume 157
 Pennsylvania House of Representatives, District 157
 Township 157-30, Lake of the Woods County, Minnesota

References

External links

 The Number 157
 Prime Curios: 157

Integers